Nkrumah Eljego Bonner (born 23 January 1989) is a Jamaican cricketer who plays international cricket for the West Indies. An occasional leg spin bowler and top order right-hand batsman, Bonner made his first-class cricket debut for Jamaica against Combined Campuses and Colleges in February 2011.

Bonner was selected as part of the West Indies team to tour England in 2011. In October 2019, he was named in Jamaica's squad for the 2019–20 Regional Super50 tournament.

In June 2020, Bonner was named in the West Indies' Test squad, for their series against England. The Test series was originally scheduled to start in May 2020, but was moved back to July 2020 due to the COVID-19 pandemic. In July 2020, he was named in the Jamaica Tallawahs squad for the 2020 Caribbean Premier League.

In December 2020, Bonner was named in the West Indies' Test and One Day International (ODI) squads for their series against Bangladesh. He made his ODI debut for the West Indies, against Bangladesh, on 20 January 2021. He made his Test debut for the West Indies, also against Bangladesh, on 3 February 2021. In May 2021, Bonner was awarded with a central contract from Cricket West Indies. He scored 86 runs in his debut match, forming a 216-run partnership with Kyle Mayers to beat Bangladesh in the first Test match by three wickets.

References

External links

1989 births
Living people
Combined Campuses and Colleges cricketers
Jamaica cricketers
Jamaica Tallawahs cricketers
Jamaican cricketers
Leeward Islands cricketers
People from Saint Catherine Parish
West Indies One Day International cricketers
West Indies Test cricketers
West Indies Twenty20 International cricketers